William Frank DuLac (born January 15, 1951) is a former American football offensive guard who played two seasons for the New England Patriots of the NFL.

Early life
DuLac was born on January 15, 1951, in Detroit, Michigan. He went to high school at Bishop Gallagher (MI).

College career
He went to Eastern Michigan for college. He played there from 1970 to 1972. He was named team captain in 1972.

Professional career
Los Angeles Rams

He was drafted in the 7th round (167) of the 1973 NFL Draft by the Los Angeles Rams. He did not play for them in 1973.

New England Patriots

DuLac played for the New England Patriots from 1974 to 1975. In both years he played 13 games. In his career he played 26 games and started 2 of them. He wore number 68.

Later life
In 2016, he was inducted into the Bishop Gallagher Hall of Fame. In 2017 he was inducted into the Eastern Michigan Hall of Fame.

References

1951 births
American football offensive guards
New England Patriots players
Eastern Michigan Eagles football players
Players of American football from Detroit
Living people